D. V. V. Danayya (born Dasari Veera Venkata Danayya, 1 April 1961) is an Indian film producer, who works in Telugu cinema. In a career spanning three decades, he has produced more than 20 films.

Danayya started his career by co-producing the fantasy comedy film Jamba Lakidi Pamba in 1992. His filmography as producer/presenter includes films like Samudram (1999), Manasunna Maaraju (2000), Sivamani (2003), Desamuduru (2006), Dubai Seenu (2007), Krishna (2008), Oy! (2009), Julayi (2012), Naayak (2013), Ninnu Kori (2017), Bharat Ane Nenu (2018) and RRR (2022).

RRR is the most expensive Indian film ever made and is the third highest grossing Indian film of all time. RRR has received various international accolades including an Academy Award, a Golden Globe and two Critics' Choice Movie.

Early life 
Danayya is born as Dasari Veera Venkata Danayya. He hails from Tallapudi near Kovvur in erstwhile West Godavari district of Andhra Pradesh. He was fascinated by movies right from his childhood. Films like Padipantalu (1976), Meghasandesam (1982) and many others were shot in the region. Watching the shooting of these films attracted him towards cinema. His parents were against the idea of him joining the film industry.

Career 
After his marriage, he shifted to Madras against everyone's advice and joined the team of Jandhyala. He worked with Jandhyala on Rendu Rellu Aaru (1986). Later, he started working in the production department in the film industry.

Danayya became close friends with E. V. V. Satyanarayana while working with him in several films. When EVV became a director, Danayya collaborated with him and co-produced a fantasy comedy film under E. V. V.'s direction titled Jamba Lakidi Pamba (1993). The film explores feminism and women's rights in a light-hearted manner and depicts the consequences when the male and female genders are reversed. It became a super hit at the box office.

He later made Maavidaakulu (1998) with E. V. V. Satyanarayana which became an average grosser. His next film was Samudram (1999) under Krishna Vamsi's direction which was also an average grosser. In 2000, he remade the Malayalam film Kottaram Veettile Apputtan (1998) as Manasunna Maaraju (2000) with Muthyala Subbaiah as director. It became a commercial success.

His next film was Seema Simham (2002) starring Balakrishna and the film underperformed at the box office. In 2003, he remade the Tamil film Thulluvadho Ilamai (2002) in Telugu as Juniors (2003) starring Allari Naresh. The film bombed at the box office. His next film Oka Radha Iddaru Krishnula Pelli (2003) was a commercial success at the box office.

He also presented Sivamani (2003) produced and directed by Puri Jagannadh that became a commercial success. His next venture was Desamuduru (2006) under the direction of Puri Jagannadh and starring Allu Arjun in the lead role. It became a blockbuster and was one of the highest grossing Telugu films of 2007.

Later, he made successful films like Dubai Seenu (2007), Krishna (2008), Oy! (2009), Julayi (2012), Naayak (2013), Ninnu Kori (2017), Bharat Ane Nenu (2018) and RRR (2022).

RRR is the most expensive Indian film ever made and is the fourth highest grossing Indian film of all time. It has been nominated in three categories at the 47th Saturn Awards including Best Action / Adventure Film and Best International Film.

Filmography

References

External links

 

Living people
Year of birth missing (living people)
Telugu film producers
DVV Entertainments